The Episcopal Church of the Redeemer is an historic Episcopal Church located on 1st Street North at Fulton Street in Salmon, Idaho. Built in 1902, it was designed by stone mason Frank Pollard. The one-story church has a Gothic Revival design which uses rusticated stone. Prominent Gothic features of the church include its symmetrical plan, Gothic arched entrances, decorative Celtic crosses, and stained glass windows.

On January 12, 1979, the church was added to the National Register of Historic Places. It is still an active parish in the Episcopal Diocese of Idaho.

References

Churches on the National Register of Historic Places in Idaho
Gothic Revival church buildings in Idaho
Episcopal church buildings in Idaho
Churches completed in 1902
20th-century Episcopal church buildings
Buildings and structures in Lemhi County, Idaho
National Register of Historic Places in Lemhi County, Idaho